Vikram may refer to:
 Vikram (name), a male name in the Hindu community
 Vikram (1986 Tamil film)
 Vikram (1986 Telugu film)
 Vikram (2022 Tamil film) 
 Vikram (actor) (born 1966), Indian actor
 Vikram (spacecraft), an Indian Moon lander
 Vikram, a character in Baital Pachisi

See also
 Vikram Samvat (Vikram's Era, "V.S." or "B.S."), a calendar in India and the official calendar of Nepal
 Vikramaditya, legendary king of India